is a Japanese footballer who plays as a forward for Oita Trinita.

Club statistics
Updated to 25 February 2019.

References

External links
Profile at Oita Trinita

1991 births
Living people
Osaka University of Health and Sport Sciences alumni
Association football people from Hyōgo Prefecture
Japanese footballers
J1 League players
J2 League players
J3 League players
Oita Trinita players
Association football forwards